Shaarey Shomayim or Shaarei/Shaaray Shamayim/Shomoyim ( "Gates of Heaven") may refer to the following Jewish synagogues:

Canada
Shaarei Shomayim (Toronto)

United States
Congregation Sha'arai Shomayim (Mobile, Alabama)
Sha'arai Shomayim Cemetery, Mobile, Alabama
First Roumanian-American congregation (Congregation Shaarey Shamoyim), Manhattan, New York
Gates of Heaven Synagogue (Shaarei Shamayim), Madison, Wisconsin
Congregation Shaarai Shomayim, Lancaster, PA 
  https://www.shaarai.org/

See also
Shaar Hashamayim (disambiguation)